The  St. Louis Cardinals season was the team's 45th year with the National Football League (NFL) and the fifth season in St. Louis.

The Cardinals (9–3–2) were the runner-up in the Eastern Conference, finishing a half game behind the Cleveland Browns (10–3–1), who won the NFL championship game on December 27. The Cardinals tied the Browns in Cleveland in September and defeated them in St. Louis in December.

As the conference runner-up, the Cardinals played the Green Bay Packers of the Western Conference in the third place Playoff Bowl in Miami, Florida. Held on January 3 at the Orange Bowl, St. Louis won in an upset, 24–17. It was the Cardinals' only postseason appearance between 1948 and 1974.

Offseason

NFL Draft

Regular season

Schedule 

^ The game with the Baltimore Colts on October 12 was originally scheduled for St. Louis,  but was moved to Baltimore due to the baseball Cardinals' participation in the World Series.

Game summaries

Week 2: at Cleveland Browns

Week 13: vs. Cleveland Browns

Standings

Postseason

Playoff Bowl 

Source:

References

External links 
 1964 St. Louis Cardinals at Pro-Football-Reference.com

St. Louis
Arizona Cardinals seasons